Tamara Schädler (born 23 April 1977 in Chur, Switzerland) is a Liechtensteiner former alpine skier who competed in the 1998 Winter Olympics.

References

1977 births
Living people
Liechtenstein female alpine skiers
Olympic alpine skiers of Liechtenstein
Alpine skiers at the 1998 Winter Olympics
People from Chur